The seventh and final competition weekend of the 2011–12 ISU Speed Skating World Cup was held in the Sportforum Hohenschönhausen arena in Berlin, Germany, from Friday, 9 March, until Sunday, 11 March 2012.

Schedule of events
The schedule of the event is below:

Medal summary

Men's events

Source: ISU

Women's events

Source: ISU

References

7
Isu World Cup, 2010-11, 7
Speed skating in Berlin
2012 in Berlin